Brian Lukas Koglin (born 7 January 1997) is a German professional footballer who plays as a centre-back for Eerste Divisie club VVV-Venlo.

Career

FC St. Pauli
After having progressed through the youth teams of TuS Bern, Eintracht Norderstedt and FC St. Pauli, Koglin made his professional debut in St. Pauli's 2–0 home loss to Hertha BSC in the DFB-Pokal on 25 October 2016, replacing the injured Daniel Buballa in the starting lineup at left-back. His league debut in the 2. Bundesliga followed six days later on 31 October 2016 in a 1–1 draw against 1. FC Nürnberg. 

He extended his contract with St. Pauli on 2 March 2018, signing an extension until 2019.

Koglin left the club when his contract expired in June 2019, having made 83 appearances and scored nine goals in six years for the reserves in the Regionalliga, and made seven total appearances for the first team in the 2. Bundesliga and DFB-Pokal.

1. FC Magdeburg
On 5 June 2019, Koglin signed a two-year contract with 1. FC Magdeburg, who had been recently relegated to the 3. Liga. Under manager Stefan Krämer, Koglin made his Magdeburg debut on 28 July 2019 in an away game against FSV Zwickau. By the end of the season, he had made 28 appearances in the third division and managed to stay up finishing 14th.

The following season, Magdeburg slightly improved and finished in 11th place, as Koglin made 21 total appearances. He left the club after the season, having made 48 total appearances for Magdeburg.

VVV-Venlo
On 27 June 2021, Koglin signed a two-year contract with Dutch club VVV-Venlo, who had recently been relegated to the second-tier Eerste Divisie. The move reunited him with his former manager at St. Pauli, Jos Luhukay. He made his debut for the club in VVV's season opener on 8 August 2021, also scoring his first goal for the club in a 2–2 home draw against NAC Breda.

Career statistics

References

External links
 

Living people
1997 births
German footballers
German expatriate footballers
Association football defenders
Footballers from Hamburg
FC St. Pauli players
1. FC Magdeburg players
VVV-Venlo players
2. Bundesliga players
3. Liga players
Regionalliga players
Eerste Divisie players
Expatriate footballers in the Netherlands
German expatriate sportspeople in the Netherlands